Mamá cumple cien años is a 1979 Spanish comedy film written and directed  by Carlos Saura. The film is a comedy sequel of the drama Ana and the Wolves directed by Saura in 1973. It was nominated for the Academy Award for Best Foreign Language Film at the 52nd Academy Awards.

Plot
Ana is married to Antonio.  They arrive at the country house in Spain where she worked as a nanny many years earlier, for the 100th birthday of the family matriarch. In their reunion, she finds that Jose died three years ago; Juan left his wife Luchy; Fernando is still living with his mother and unsuccessfully trying to fly a hang glider; and the three little girls are grown-up. Further, she discovers that the dysfunctional family is completely broken, and Luchy in embezzling mother's money. When Juan arrives for the celebration, he plots with Fernando and Luchy to kill the mother to get the inheritance. Meanwhile, Antonio has a brief affair with Natalia.

Cast
 Geraldine Chaplin as Ana
 Amparo Muñoz as Natalia
 Fernando Fernán Gómez as Fernando
 Norman Briski as Antonio
 Rafaela Aparicio as Mamá
 Charo Soriano as Luchi
 José Vivó as Juan
 Ángeles Torres as Carlota
 Elisa Nandi as Victoria
 Rita Maiden as Solange
 Monique Ciron as Anny
 José María Prada as José (uncredited)

See also
 List of submissions to the 52nd Academy Awards for Best Foreign Language Film
 List of Spanish submissions for the Academy Award for Best Foreign Language Film

References

External links
 

1979 films
1970s Spanish-language films
1979 comedy films
Films directed by Carlos Saura
Spanish comedy films
Films produced by Elías Querejeta
1970s Spanish films